Dr. Walter Brice House and Office is a historic plantation house and office located near Winnsboro, Fairfield County, South Carolina.  It was built about 1840, and is a two-story, weatherboarded frame, L-shaped Greek Revival style dwelling. It features a two-tiered, pedimented front verandah supported by four wooden pillars. The Dr. Walter Brice Office is a 10-foot-by-12-foot weatherboarded frame building with a metal gable roof.  Dr. Walter Brice (1804 - ca. 1871) was a prominent Fairfield County planter and physician before the American Civil War.

It was added to the National Register of Historic Places in 1984.

References

Plantation houses in South Carolina
Houses on the National Register of Historic Places in South Carolina
Greek Revival houses in South Carolina
Houses completed in 1840
Houses in Fairfield County, South Carolina
National Register of Historic Places in Fairfield County, South Carolina